Slabce is a market town in Rakovník District in the Central Bohemian Region of the Czech Republic. It has about 700 inhabitants.

Administrative parts
Villages of Kostelík, Malé Slabce, Modřejovice, Nová Ves, Rousínov, Skupá and Svinařov are administrative parts of Slabce.

Geography
It lies in the Plasy Uplands. The Berounka River flows along the southern municipal border. The almost entire municipal territory lies in the Křivoklátsko Protected Landscape Area.

Notable people
Karel Burian (1870–1924), operatic tenor

References

External links

Populated places in Rakovník District
Market towns in the Czech Republic